Joateca is a municipality in the Morazán department of El Salvador. It has a population of 4,210.

External links
 Official website

Municipalities of the Morazán Department